The following lists events that happened during 1992 in Chile.

Incumbents
President of Chile: Patricio Aylwin

Events

March
 9 March – Buenos Días a Todos airs for the first time.

October
 2–4 October – 1992 South American Youth Championships in Athletics

November
 27–28 November – 1992 Chilean telethon

Sport

 Chile at the 1992 Summer Olympics
 Chile at the 1992 Winter Olympics
 1992 Copa Chile
 1992 Copa Interamericana
 1992 Recopa Sudamericana

Births
3 March – María Jesús Matthei
13 March – Jayson Mena

Deaths
date unknown – César Barros (b. 1912)

References 

 
Years of the 20th century in Chile
Chile